Michelle Christina Cerqueira Gomes Lopes (born 21 November 1989), simply known as Michelle, is a Brazilian footballer who plays as a goalkeeper for São Paulo.

Career
Born in Rio de Janeiro, Michelle finished her graduation with Team Chicago Brasil, and made her senior debut with English side Keynsham Town in 2010. In 2012, after representing Swiss side BSC Wildcats Freiamt in the previous year, she returned to her home country and played for America-RJ.

In 2013, Michelle joined Foz Cataratas and won two Campeonato Paranaense titles with the side. She moved to Santos for the 2015 campaign, initially as a backup to Dani Neuhaus.

In 2016, Michelle was loaned to Israeli club Maccabi Petah Tikva, but returned to Sereias da Vila in 2017 and subsequently became a starter for the side.

Honours
Foz Cataratas
Campeonato Paranaense de Futebol Feminino: 2013, 2014

Santos
Campeonato Brasileiro de Futebol Feminino Série A1: 2017
Campeonato Paulista de Futebol Feminino: 2018
Copa Paulista: 2020

References

External links

1989 births
Living people
Footballers from Rio de Janeiro (city)
Brazilian women's footballers
Women's association football goalkeepers
Keynsham Town L.F.C. players
Santos FC (women) players
Hapoel Petah Tikva F.C. (women) players
São Paulo FC (women) players
FA Women's National League players
Campeonato Brasileiro de Futebol Feminino Série A1 players
Ligat Nashim players

Brazilian expatriate women's footballers
Brazilian expatriate sportspeople in England
Expatriate women's footballers in England
Brazilian expatriate sportspeople in Switzerland
Expatriate women's footballers in Switzerland
Brazilian expatriate sportspeople in Israel
Expatriate women's footballers in Israel